Nicole Le Peih (born 28 September 1959) is a French politician of La République En Marche! (LREM) and Territories of Progress (TDP) who has been serving as a member of the French National Assembly since the 2017 elections, representing the department of Morbihan.

Political career
In parliament, Le Peih serves on the Committee on Foreign Affairs and the Committee on European Affairs. In addition to her committee assignments, she is a member of the French parliamentary friendship groups with Bolivia and Cuba.

Political positions
In July 2019, Le Peih voted in favor of the French ratification of the European Union’s Comprehensive Economic and Trade Agreement (CETA) with Canada.

See also
 2017 French legislative election

References

1959 births
Living people
People from Pontivy
La République En Marche! politicians
Territories of Progress politicians
Deputies of the 15th National Assembly of the French Fifth Republic
Deputies of the 16th National Assembly of the French Fifth Republic
Women members of the National Assembly (France)
21st-century French women politicians